Lieutenant General Sir Henry Knight Storks  (5 April 1811 – 6 September 1874) was a British soldier and colonial governor.

Military career
Educated at Charterhouse School, he entered the Army on 10 January 1828 as an ensign of the 61st Regiment of Foot. He was promoted lieutenant on 2 March 1832, exchanged to the 14th Regiment of Foot on 23 March 1832 and was promoted captain on 30 October 1835. Exchanging to the 38th Regiment of Foot on 30 May 1836, he served with them in the Ionian Islands in 1840 and was promoted major on 7 August 1840.

He went on half pay from the regiment on 23 May 1845 and served in a variety of staff posts. He served as an Assistant Adjutant General during the seventh of the Cape Frontier Wars from 1846 to 1847, and was subsequently promoted to an unattached lieutenant colonelcy on 15 September 1848. From 1849 to 1854, he was Assistant Military Secretary at Mauritius, and was promoted colonel on 28 November 1854.

Promoted major-general, Storks superintended the British bases set up in Ottoman territory during the Crimean War, where he supported the nursing efforts of Florence Nightingale. After the war, he was awarded the KCB (2 January 1857) and employed from 1857 to 1859 by the War Office as Secretary for Military Correspondence.

He now began his career in colonial government, appointed Lord High Commissioner of the Ionian Islands on 2 February 1859. While serving there, he was created GCMG in 1860, and reorganized the judiciary of the islands before the end of the commissionership (by treaty) on 14 November 1863. He was made a GCB on 1 July 1864. Sent next to Malta, he was appointed Governor on 15 November 1864. However, he was called the next year to Jamaica to investigate the disturbances there, including the Morant Bay rebellion, and was appointed Governor of Jamaica on 12 December 1865. He held that post until 16 July 1866. Upon his return, he was created a Privy Councillor (10 November 1866). He resigned the Governorship of Malta on 15 May 1867.

Now back at the War Office, he was appointed Controller-in-Chief and Under-Secretary at the War Office on 19 December 1867. There, he was involved in the re-organization of Army logistics that took place after the Crimean War. He was appointed Surveyor-General of the Ordnance on 5 August 1870, the first to hold that post since the Crimean War. On 10 October 1870 he was appointed colonel of the 70th Regiment of Foot, an office he held for the remainder of his life.

Last years in politics

Entering politics in 1870, Storks was endorsed as the Liberal candidate at a parliamentary by-election for the Borough of Newark that followed the death of the sitting Liberal MP. Unfortunately he was opposed by progressive liberal and colonial administrator Sir George Grey, who had previously been governor of South Australia, New Zealand and the Cape Colony, standing as an independent liberal. Grey's extremist views on the questions of the Colonial Empire, of emigration, of Home Rule for Ireland and the cause of the English poor were contrary to the interests of Gladstone's Liberal government. Determined that Grey should not be elected and seeing that splitting the liberal vote would result in both Grey and Storks losing to the Conservative candidate, the Liberal government engineered an arrangement where both would withdraw, leaving another Liberal candidate, Samuel Boteler Bristowe, to take the seat. Storks was rewarded with the newly revived post of Surveyor-General of the Ordnance and Grey returned to New Zealand later that year.

The following year Storks was elected to parliament at the Ripon by-election. He was promoted lieutenant general on 25 October 1871. While in Parliament, he spoke in favor of the abolition of the purchase system for Army commissions. His stance on the Contagious Diseases Acts contributed to his defeat by the Earl de Grey in the 1874 general election. He died shortly after losing the election, on 6 September 1874. He was buried in the Western part of Highgate Cemetery.

References

External links 
 

|-

|-

1811 births
1874 deaths
Burials at Highgate Cemetery
British Army generals
Members of the Parliament of the United Kingdom for English constituencies
Knights Grand Cross of the Order of the Bath
Knights Grand Cross of the Order of St Michael and St George
Members of the Privy Council of the United Kingdom
People educated at Charterhouse School
Governors of Jamaica
UK MPs 1868–1874
West Yorkshire Regiment officers
61st Regiment of Foot officers
Governors and Governors-General of Malta